Yevgeni Anatolyevich Popov (Евгений Анатольевич Попов) (born Krasnoyarsk, 1946) is a Russian writer, best known for short stories.

Biography
He published his first story in 1962. That same year, he was expelled from the Komsomol for his participation in samizdat activities.

In 1968, he graduated from the Russian State Geological Prospecting University and worked as a geologist in the northeast. While there, he wrote numerous stories, many inspired by the interesting characters he encountered. His first professional recognition came in 1976, when one of his stories was published in Novy Mir, with a foreword by Vasily Shukshin. In 1978, he was admitted to the Union of Soviet Writers, but was expelled seven months later for his role in creating , an uncensored almanac that was published outside the USSR.

He found himself in trouble again in 1980, when he came under scrutiny by the KGB for helping to produce a similar almanac called Catalog, which was published in the United States. His membership in the Writers Union was restored in 1988, during the period of Glasnost. His stories began to be published in large numbers in the 1990s; he has also written numerous novels considered to be in the metafiction tradition. He makes use of elements of fairy tale construction and literary parody.

Since the early 2000s he has been an active internet blogger on Live Journal and a vocal critic of Vladimir Putin's government.
In 2016 he became Chairman of the Jury Fazil Iskander International Literary Award

Bibliography

Novels
 Dusha patriota, ili razlichnye poslaniia Ferfichkinu (The Soul of the Patriot) [1989]. Moscow: Tekst, 1985. Translated into English as The Soul of a Patriot or Various Epistles to Ferfichkin, trans. Robert Porter (Harvill: London, 1994).
 Prekrasnost’ zhizni. Glavy iz ‘romana s gazetoi’, kotoryi nikogda ne budet nachat i zakonchen (The Splendour of Life. Chapters from a 'love-affair with a newspaper' which will never be started or finished) (Moscow: Rabochii, 1990).
 Nakanune nakanune (On the Eve of the Eve), Volga, 4 (1993), 3-62.
 Podlinnaia istoriia "zelenikh muzykantov", roman-kommentarii (The Real Story of the 'Green Musicians: a Novel-Commentary) [Znamia, 6 (1998), 10-110], (Moscow: Vagrius, 1999).
 Master Khaos. Otkrytaia mul’tiagentnaia literaturnaia sistema s poslesloviem uchënogo cheloveka, (Master Chaos. An open multi-agent literary system with a postscript by a scholarly person) Oktiabr’, 4 (2002), 3-111.
 Arbeit. Shirokoe polotno (Arbeit: A Broad Canvas) (Moscow: Astrel', 2012).

Short Story Collections
 Veselie Rusi (Merry-making in Old Russia) (Ann Arbor, Michigan: Ardis, 1981).
 Zhdu liubvi ne verolomnoi (I Await a Love That's True)(Moscow: Sovetskií Pisatel’, 1989).
 Samolët na Kël’n (The Plane to Cologne) (Moscow: Orbita, 1991).

References

 Marina Kanevskaya, ‘The Diary of a Writer from Tëplyi Stan’: The Beautifulness of Life by Evgenii Popov’, Endquote: Sots-Art Literature and Soviet Grand Style, eds., Marina Balina, Nancy Condee, Evgeny Dobrenko, (Evanston, Illinois, Northwestern University Press, 2000),193-210.
 Sally Laird, Voices of Russian Literature: Interviews with Ten Contemporary Writers, (Cambridge University Press, 1999).
 Mark Lipovetsky, ‘Self-Portrait on a Timeless Background: Transformations of the Autobiographical Mode in Russian Postmodernism’, trans. Diana Goldstaub, A/B: Auto/Biography Studies, 11 (2), (1996), pp. 140–62
 Ingunn Lunde, ‘Footnotes of a Graphomaniac: The Language Question in Evgenii Popov’s The True Story of “The Green Musicians”’, Russian Review 68 (1) (2009), 70-88.
 Jeremy Morris, Mastering Chaos: the Metafictional Worlds of Evgeny Popov, (Oxford: Peter Lang, 2013).
 Robert Porter, ‘Evgeny Popov’, Russia’s Alternative Prose, (Oxford/Providence, USA: Berg, 1994), 88-137.
 Anatoly Vishevsky, 'Creating a Shattered World: Toward the Poetics of Yevgeny Popov', World Literature Today, Vol. 67, 1993, 119-124.

1946 births
Living people
Writers from Krasnoyarsk